Svend Aage Thomsen (20 February 1911 – 26 March 1961) was a Danish hurdler. He competed in the men's 110 metres hurdles at the 1936 Summer Olympics. In 1943, he founded Den Jyske Idrætsskole, which in 1998 changed its name to Vejle Idrætshøjskole.

References

1911 births
1961 deaths
Athletes (track and field) at the 1936 Summer Olympics
Danish male hurdlers
Danish male high jumpers
Olympic athletes of Denmark
Place of birth missing